Dashlujeh (also Romanized as Dāshlūjeh; also known as Vāshlūjeh, and Wāshlūjeh) is a village in Howmeh Rural District, in the Central District of Khodabandeh County, Zanjan Province, Iran. At the 2006 census, its population was 522, in 108 families.

References 

Populated places in Khodabandeh County